Joseph Rosen (Yiddish: יוסף ראָזין, Yosef Rosin; 1858 – 5 March 1936) known as the Rogatchover Gaon (Genius of Rogachev) and  Tzofnath Paneach (Decipherer of Secrets—the title of his main work), was a rabbi and one of the most prominent talmudic scholars of the early 20th-century. Rosen was known as a  gaon (genius) because of his photographic memory and tendency to connect sources from the Talmud to seemingly unrelated situations. Rosen has been described as the foremost Talmudic genius of his time.

Biography
Joseph Rosen was born in Rogachov, now Belarus, into a Hasidic family of Chabad-Kopust Hasidim, and was educated in the local cheder (elementary school). His unusual capabilities were noticed at the age of 13, when he was sent to study in Slutsk along with Chaim Soloveitchik (5 years his senior), under Yosef Dov Soloveitchik (Beis Halevi). He subsequently studied under Yehoshua Leib Diskin (Maharil Diskin) in Shklov. In 1889, he assumed the rabbinate of the Hasidic community in Dvinsk for almost 50 years, where his non-Hasidic counterpart was Meir Simcha of Dvinsk. They served in parallel until the late 1920s, and enjoyed excellent relations.

Among those who received semikha (rabbinic ordination) from him were Menachem Mendel Schneerson (the seventh Lubavitcher Rebbe, 1902-1994), Mordecai Savitsky (1911-1991) of Boston, Zvi Olshwang (1873–1961) of Chicago (brother-in-law of Shimon Shkop) and Avraham Eliyahu Plotkin (1888-1948; author of Birurei Halachot—a copy of the actual semikha is included in that work).

Rosen is remembered for his breadth of Torah knowledge and caustic wit. He did not suffer inadequacy lightly. He was similarly reputed to rarely quote any rabbinic authority post-Maimonides, and avoided recent rabbinic works of the Acharonim in favour of the Rishonim (those preceding the late 15th century). His responses to queries of Jewish law are generally enigmatic and cryptic.

Rosen died in Vienna in 1936 at the Vienna Sanitorium  and his body was sent to Dvinsk for burial.

Throughout his life, despite not being an official Lubavitcher Hasid, he maintained very close connections to Lubavitcher Hasidim and their rebbes Sholom Dovber Schneersohn and Yosef Yitzchak Schneersohn. After Sholom Dovber's death, he supported the decision to appoint the young Yosef Yitzchak as the new Rebbe. Rosen is a famous figure in Chabad-Lubavitch folklore. His name often comes up in stories told in yeshivas and during farbrengens (Hasidic gatherings). Stories range from self-sacrifice and dedication to Torah values despite the pressures of the Russian government, to special sensitivity to the Chassidus and Kabbalah (spiritual dimensions of the Torah) to his genius in the revealed Torah.

Scholarship
Rosen was a noted Talmudic scholar and published a number of his works on the Talmud and Maimonides. His main work, a commentary on Maimonides, was published during his lifetime, as were five volumes of halakhic (Jewish law) responsa. The remainder of his surviving writings appeared in the United States and Israel many years after his death; all are titled Tzofnath Paneach (Decipherer of Secrets—a title given to the Biblical Joseph by Pharaoh). His manuscripts were smuggled out of Latvia in the form of micro photographs sent via mail to the Safern family in the Bronx at the outbreak of World War II by his successor, Yisrael Alter Safern-Fuchs (1911–1942), who remained in Latvia to complete this task, and his daughter Rachel Citron, who had come to Dvinsk from the Land of Israel to help preserve her father's manuscripts. Both were murdered in the Holocaust. A portion of these manuscripts was edited and published by Menachem Mendel Kasher. Seven manuscripts were published by Machon Tzofnas Paneah, headed by Mordechai Pinchas Teitz. Machon Hamaor in Jerusalem is now publishing the remaining manuscripts.

Rosen's approach to Torah study is discussed in Shlomo Yosef Zevin's Ishim v'Shitot (Personalities and Approaches).

Rosen's works include responsa and novellae on Torah and Talmud. They are regarded as difficult and inaccessible, as he employs the philosophical terminology of Maimonides' The Guide for the Perplexed even in non-philosophical analyses. Kasher, therefore, included Mefa'aneach Tzefunoth (Decipherer of Secrets), an explanatory commentary to facilitate understanding of Rosen's influential work.

Works
Rosen authored a number of works on Jewish law, some of which were published in his lifetime.
Tzafnath Paane'ach – his magnum opus, a two volume commentary on Maimonides's Mishneh Torah
Tzafnath Paane'ach al HaTorah  – a five volume commentary on the bible
Tzafnath Paane'ach al HaShas – a four volume commentary on the Talmud, covering tractates Bava Kamma, Bava Metzia, Makkos, Sanhedrin, Horayos
Tzafnath Paane'ach Responsa – his responsa on Jewish law
Shaalos Utshuvos Tzafnath Paane'ach Hachadashos – additional volumes responsa on Jewish law
Chibur al Moreh Nevuchim – a commentary on The Guide for the Perplexed, published at the end of his commentary on the bible
Michtvei Torah – correspondence between the Gaon and Rabbi Mordechai Kalina

References

External links
 Tzafnat Pane'ach Institute - organization striving to research and republish Rosen's works
The Rogatchover Gaon by Dovber Schwartz
Schwartz, Dovber. "The Rogatchover Gaon: A Study in Abstraction". Hakirah: The Flatbush Journal of Jewish Law and Thought.

1858 births
1936 deaths
People from Rahachow
People from Rogachyovsky Uyezd
Belarusian Hasidic rabbis
Hasidic rabbis in Europe
19th-century rabbis from the Russian Empire
20th-century Russian rabbis
Authors of works on the Talmud
Writers from Daugavpils